Paradise in Gazankulu is an album by Harry Belafonte, released by EMI Records in 1988. As of 2020, it is Harry Belafonte's final studio album. The album deals with the plight of black South Africans under the Apartheid system. The album was re-released as an official mp3 download by amazon.com, and iTunes in the U.K. in 2010.

Track listing
 "We Are the Wave" (Jake Holmes, Richard Cummings, The Soul Brothers) – 3:32
 "Paradise in Gazankulu" (Holmes, Oben Ngobeni) – 4:27
 "Skin to Skin" (Holmes, Godfrey Nelson) – 4:25
 "Amandla" (Holmes, D. Zuma) – 4:05
 "Kwela (Listen To The Man)" (Holmes, S. M. Nkabinda) – 4:00
 "Monday to Monday" (Holmes, Zuma, R. Klaas) – 4:14
 "Global Carnival" (Holmes, Alistair Coakley) – 3:43
 "Capetown" (Holmes, M. Xaba, R. Bopape) – 3:58
 "Sisiwami (Sweet Sister)" (Holmes, The Soul Brothers) – 4:49
 "Move It" (Holmes, Van Van, Vusi Khumalo) – 4:57

Personnel
Harry Belafonte – vocals
Alistair Coakely – guitar
Jose Alves – guitar
"Stompie" Themba Dlzmini  – guitar
Laurence Matshiza – guitar, background vocals
V. Mkhize – guitar
Maxwell "China" Mngadi – guitar
José Neto – guitar
Oben Ngobeni – guitar
Marks Makwane – guitar
Alex Acuña – percussion
Neil Clarke – percussion
Youssou N'Dour – percussion
Chi Sharpe – percussion
Assane Thiam – percussion
Babakar Meaye – percussion
Richard Cummings – keyboards
Christopher Dlathu – bass
Bakithi Kumalo – bass
Denny Laloutte – bass
Thembile Michael Masoka – bass
Joseph Mokwela – bass
Sicelo Ndlela – bass
Vusi Khumalo – drums, background vocals
Lucky Monoma – drums
Bongani Nxele – drums
Richie Marrero – keyboards, background vocals
Mduduzi Mlangeni – keyboards
Dumisane Ngubeni – keyboards
Moses "Crocodile" Ngwenya – keyboards
Hilton Rosenthal – keyboards, guitar
West Nkosi – pennywhistles
Victor Paz – trumpet
Francis Bonny – trumpet
Wilmer Wise – trumpet
Lemmy "Special" Mabaso – saxophone
Ricky Ford – saxophone
Morris Goldberg – saxophone
Dick Griffin – trombone
Carlos Ward – saxophone
Jennifer Warnes – vocals on "Skin to Skin"
Bobby Allende – background vocals
Jake Holmes – background vocals
Ralph Irizarry – background vocals
Selina Khoza – background vocals
Brenda Fassie – background vocals
Sharon Brooks – background vocals
John Cartwright – background vocals
Jean Madubane – background vocals
Debbie Malone – background vocals
Ronnie Martin – background vocals
David Masondo – background vocals
Grace Ngobeni  – background vocals
Jane Ngobeni – background vocals
Marilyn Nokwe – background vocals
Tu Nokwe – background vocals
Deborah Sharpe – background vocals
Ty Stevens – background vocals
Production notes:
Hilton Rosenthal – producer, drum programming
Harry Belafonte – executive producer
Richard Cummings – arranger, conductor
Peter Thwaites – engineer
Charlie Paakkari – engineer
David Belafonte – engineer
Larry Walsh – engineer
Chris Rudy – engineer
Tom Lewis – engineer
Fernando Perdigao – assistant engineer
Bobby Summerfield – mixer, engineer, drum programming, sampling, synthesizer programming
Scott Ansell – assistant engineer
Ellen Fitton – assistant engineer
Billy Straus – assistant engineer
Ben-Ben, Hahn – assistant engineer
Peter Doell – assistant engineer
Bernie Grundman – mastering
David Nadien – concert master
Chris Callis – photography
Suzette Abbot – photography
Carol Chen – design
Henry Marquez – art direction

References

1988 albums
Harry Belafonte albums
EMI Records albums